La fuerza de creer (English: The Power of Believing) is a Spanish-language television series on Univision on 3 September 2017. The series is written by Jimena Romero and Adriana Romera. The first season is produced by W Studios and Lemon Studios, while the second season is produced by Cinemat. The series tells stories with which the US Hispanics are identified and at the same time offers resources of the empowerment campaign, Pequeños y Valiosos. The third season premiered on 9 January 2022.

Plot

Season 1 
Dr. Roberto López, founder of the Centro de Salud Pública Central, has been serving young patients for three decades, but is considering retirement. His colleague, David Ureña, is a pediatrician who seems to be more concerned with the statistics and financial situation of the center than with improving patient care. This causes him to have conflicts with the most recent member of the team, Dr. Laura Gómez, whose patience, empathy and sensible advice make her very popular among patients despite a disturbing incident from her past. But the income has decreased, the clinic is in danger of closure, and the envious Dr. Ureña blames Dr. Gómez for the changes she made in clinical procedures during his absence. While physicians face declining clinic income and personal challenges, parents continue to take their children to the medical center, where in addition to care, they receive advice on a variety of early childhood development issues, such as ways to encourage cognitive and linguistic development at an early age, the benefits of bilingualism, the importance of parents and other caregivers, socio-emotional health, among others.

Season 2 
After 25 years as an elementary school teacher, Clara Martinez is found without a job and decides to seek employment at a community center for low-income families teaching English as a second language. Clara begins to discover the problems of the community and the children and families who visit her regularly, and decides to ask the help of her friend Susana López who is a pediatrician and psychologist. Together they embark on a mission to develop a support program for parents and children at the center. But they quickly encounter a major obstacle: commissioner Alfredo Dominguez intends to dismantle the center to sell the land to a private company with plans to build a golf center.

Season 3 
The season follows Ricardo, a high school senior, who in addition to being overburdened with his student duties, struggles with the decision to participate in an internship at a technology company even though his father asks for his help working in the small family business.

Cast

Season 1 
 María de la Fuente as Laura Gómez
 Jean Paul Leroux as David Ureña
 Guillermo Quintanilla as Roberto López
 Raquel Garza as Sol
 Ilse Ikeda as Clara
 Raúl Coronado

Season 2 
 Scarlet Ortiz as Clara Martinez
 Rene Lavan as Mark Riley
 Gabriela Rivero as Berenice
 Daniel Lugo as Rafael
 Sandra Destenave as Susana
 Roberto Escobar as Alfredo Dominguez
 Ana González as Ana
 Ana Terreno as Camila

Season 3 
 Guillermo Quintanilla as Luis
 Martha Julia as Abigail
 Frances Ondiviela
 Paty Díaz
 Lourdes Reyes as Mrs. Clark
 Víctor Civeira
 Miguel Pizarro as Sam
 Ana Silvia Garza as Gladys
 Alberto Pavón
 Elaine Haro as Katia Suárez
 Jorge Trejo Reyes as Ricardo López
 Daney as Vicente
 Arantza Descalzo as Violeta
 Mario de Jesús as Alex
 Paola Real

Episodes

Season 1 (2017)

Season 2 (2019)

Season 3 (2022)

Webisodes

References 

2017 American television series debuts
Television series produced by Lemon Films
Television series produced by W Studios
Univision original programming